Neycharan (also Romanized as Neycharān and Naycharān; also known as Letiaran, Letīyārān, and Letyaran) is a village in Mavazekhan-e Shomali Rural District, Khvajeh District, Heris County, East Azerbaijan Province, Iran. At the 2006 census, its population was 256, in 54 families.

References 

Populated places in Heris County